Edith Schönenberger (born 20 January 1954) is a Swiss former racing cyclist. She was the Swiss National Road Race champion in 1984, 1985, 1986, 1987 and 1989. She also competed in the women's road race at the 1988 Summer Olympics.

References

External links

1954 births
Living people
Swiss female cyclists
Place of birth missing (living people)
Cyclists at the 1988 Summer Olympics
Olympic cyclists of Switzerland